On 18 July 2022, 10:00 AM a Baraati boat sank in Indus River near Machchka in Sadiqabad, Rahim Yar Khan District, Punjab, Pakistan. The number of people killed in the incident is 50, including women and children, and 24 other people are missing. Around 75 people were on board the boat while the operation is on to search for more people who drowned. According to the district administration, the accident occurred due to overcrowding in the boat.

According to the Deputy Commissioner, the wedding procession included two boats, on which more than 150 people, including women and children, were on board. The first boat, which was carrying about 75 people, suddenly capsized and all the people on board fell into the river. 35 of them were rescued by the men on the second boat. Several people were brought to safety by divers, but the women and their children drowned in the river due to fast flowing water.

Rescue operation
Machchka is a very remote area, where it would take two hours to reach the rescue personnel. After two hours when the operation was started, the river flow was found to be very fast.
According to the spokesperson of Rescue Punjab, water rescue operation is going on in which 39 divers are participating. The operation was halted on Monday night and resumed on Tuesday. After eight hours of continuous operation on Monday night in the rapid and deep river, the rescue operations were stopped due to the darkness of the night. As soon as the light spread in the morning on Tuesday, the rescue activities were started again. Two days later Pakistan army SSG commandos also joined the operation.

Reactions
Chief Minister Hamza Shahbaz Sharif expressed grief and sorrow over the loss of life in the incident. He directed the local authorities to speed up the rescue operation to search for the missing persons. He has also sought a report from the administration about the accident.

References

2022 disasters in Pakistan
2022 in Punjab, Pakistan
Boating accident deaths
Deaths by drowning
Disasters in Punjab, Pakistan
July 2022 events in Pakistan
Rahim Yar Khan District